The 49th Australian Film Institute Awards ceremony, honoring the best in film for 2007, was broadcast from the Melbourne Convention and Exhibition Centre in Melbourne, Australia on the Nine Network. Geoffrey Rush hosted the show, for the second time. He previously presided over the 48th Australian Film Institute Awards the previous year.

The nominees were announced on 24 October 2007. Deborra-Lee Furness, Sibylla Budd, Marny Kennedy, and AFI President James Hewison made the announcements. Romulus, My Father got the highest nominations with a total of sixteen with The Home Song Stories with the second highest number of fourteen. Clubland came third with eleven nominations.

The award winners were announced at two ceremonies; one on the 5 December ("industry" categories) and the other on 6 December (top categories), 2007. Films that won multiple Australian Film Institute Awards include: The Home Song Stories (7) and Romulus, My Father (4). The Home Song Stories performed exceptionally well, taking out a total 7 of its 14 nominations. The wins included, Best Direction (Tony Ayres), Best Actress in a Lead Role (Joan Chen), Best Screenplay (Tony Ayres), Achievement in Cinematogoraphy (Nigel Bluck), Achievement in Editing (Denise Haratzis), Best Original Score (Antony Partos), Best Achievement in Production Design (Melinda Doring) and the award for Achievement in Costume Design for Cappi Ireland.

Winners of major awards

Films

Feature films

Special honors

Television

Multiple nominations

Multiple film nominations
The following films received multiple nominations.

 16 nominations:
Romulus, My Father
 14 nominations:
The Home Song Stories
 11 nominations:
Clubland
 9 nominations:
Noise

 3 nominations
 Razzle Dazzle: A Journey Into Dance 

Film
A
A
AFI
AFI